Peter Alfons Christiaan Van Den Begin (born 25 October 1964 in Berchem) is a Belgian actor and director. He has two daughters with actress and singer-songwriter Tine Reymer.

His very first theater performances include acting in such plays as De Straat (Ronald Van Rillaer), Droomspel (Mannen van den Dam) and De getemde feeks (theaterMalpertuis). Later on he has continued his theater acting career by performing in various plays. Under Blauwe Maandag Compagnie he has performed in such pieces like All for love, Joko and Vrijen met dieren.

Awards
In the 44th Gent Film Festival in 2017 Van de Begin received two Flemish Actors' Guild awards as the best actor both in theater for his role in Risjaar Drei (Olympique Dramatique & Toneelhuis) and in film for his performance in the movie King of the Belgians.

Filmography 

Together with Stany Crets he has been a writer for:

 De Raf en Ronny Show (1998)
 Raf en Ronny II (1999)
 Debby en Nancy Laid Knight (2001)
 Raf en Ronny III (2001)
 Sketch à gogo (2004)
 Als 't maar beweegt (2005)
 Debby & Nancy's Happy hour (2007)

Theater 
 Risjaar Drei (2017)
 Oliver! (2010 - 2011) - musical
 Licht aan! A.U.B. (2006)
 Bloedarm (2002)
 De krippel (2002)
 Joko (1993)
 All for love (1993)
 Wilde Lea (1991)
 De meeuw (1989)
 Droomspel (1986)
 De Straat (1984)

References

External links

1964 births
Living people
20th-century Flemish male actors
21st-century Flemish male actors
Flemish male film actors
People from Berchem